North Korea participated in the 2011 Asian Winter Games in Almaty and Astana, Kazakhstan from January 30, 2011 to February 6, 2011. The team is less than half the size that was sent to the 2007 games in Changchun.

Medal summary

Figure skating
 
Men

Ice dance

Ice hockey

Women 
North Korea will send a women's team. The team consists of 20 athletes.

Group A 

All times are local (UTC+6).

Short track speed skating

Women

Speed skating

Women

References

Nations at the 2011 Asian Winter Games
Asian Winter Games
North Korea at the Asian Winter Games